Charles Burke is former head coach of the Hong Kong National Men and Women's cricket teams. He took over the post in May 2010 after completing 2 years with the International Cricket Council (ICC) where he was a development officer for the East Asia Pacific region.

It was a successful time at the helm of Hong Kong with the u19s Men and Women both making the semi finals of the ACC tournaments, the Women won the T20 ACC tournament in Kuwait and the Men won promotion to ICC Pepsi World Cricket League Division 2 after winning the Division 3 event in January 2011.

The former WACA A grade bowling all-rounder is a Cricket Australia Level 3 coach and enjoyed success with under-age representative teams in Western Australia over the years in various roles as coach, coaching officer and bowling coach.

As of 2022, Charlie Burke is back living in Western Australia.

References

External links

1979 births
Living people
Australian cricket coaches
Coaches of the Hong Kong national cricket team
Australian expatriate sportspeople in Hong Kong
Sportspeople from Perth, Western Australia